Angelsberg is a small town in the commune of Fischbach, in central Luxembourg. As of 2005, the town's population is 283.

Climate

Location
Angelsberg is 5 km west of Mersch on the CR 118. Other neighboring towns are the Beringerberg settlement to the north and Schoos to the south. To the east of the village is Meysemburg Castle.

History
The oldest street in Angelsberg is the Rue de L'Eglise, on which the Church of St. Cornelius is located. In the 18th and 19th centuries it was the main road of the town, and led via a country road to Mersch. A few houses from the 18th century have been preserved here. The church itself is younger and was built in 1885 according to plans by architect Carl (Charles) Arendt in the neo-Romanesque style. It replaced a previous building from 1570, which had to be demolished in 1883 due to dilapidation.

The Rue de Mersch was the next road created.

References

Fischbach, Mersch
Towns in Luxembourg